Southwest Washington is a geographical area of the U.S. state of Washington, encompassing roughly half of Western Washington. It generally includes the Olympia area southwards to the Oregon-Washington state line at Vancouver. Olympia, the state capital, has been a transshipment center for Southwest Washington since its settlement in the mid-19th century.

Cities
Cities and towns in Southwest Washington include:

 Aberdeen
 Camas
 Centralia
 Chehalis
 Hoquiam
 Kelso
 Lacey
 Longview
 Olympia
 Raymond
 Shelton
 South Bend
 Tumwater
 Vancouver
 Washougal
 Woodland
 Yelm
 Ridgefield

Cultural events and institutions 
The Southwest Washington Fair is held annually in the city of Chehalis.

The Southwest Washington State College Committee study of the late 1960s eventually resulted in the establishment of The Evergreen State College in Olympia.

PeaceHealth Southwest Medical Center in Vancouver is the region's largest medical center.

In the early 20th century, the region was home to a Class-D Minor league baseball league known as the Southwest Washington League.

The Sou'wester is the magazine of the Pacific County Historical Society.

See also
Area code 360 - portion south of 206 and 253 is roughly Southwest Washington 
  - the major north-south transportation link for the region
List of regions of the United States
 U.S. Route 12 in Washington - the major east-west link (west of White Pass)

Notes

References

Bibliography

External links

Regions of Washington (state)